Francisco Filho may refer to:

 Francisco Filho (martial artist) (born 1971), Brazilian martial artist
 Francisco Filho (footballer) (born 1940), Brazilian football coach and former footballer